Google Domains is a domain name registrar operated by Google.

The service offers domain registration, DNS hosting, dynamic DNS, domain forwarding, and email forwarding. It provides native integration support for Google Cloud DNS and Google Workspace. It also offers one-click DNS configuration that connects the domains with Blogger, Google Sites, Squarespace, Wix.com, Weebly, Bluehost, Shopify, and Firebase. It supports domain privacy, custom nameservers, and DNSSEC.

The domain registration service is accredited by ICANN – the IANA number assigned by ICANN to Google is 895.

Google became a domain name registrar as early as in 2005. Google Domains was publicly launched under a beta test mode on January 13, 2015, and the beta phase ended on March 15, 2022. , it supports more than 300 top-level domains.

On March 15, 2022, Google announced that Google Domains was officially out of beta.

References

External links 

Domains
Internet properties established in 2015
2015 establishments in California
Domain name registrars
Google